Hrútafjörður is a fjord in the north-west of Iceland. It is around 36 km long and lies to the south of Húnaflói bay.

The junction and farmstead of Brú is at its southern tip and serves as a local agricultural service station.

"Hrúta" is plural possessive of "Hrútur" which means the male sheep.

See also

Fjords of Iceland